The Wills Masters was a golf tournament held in Australia and played annually from 1963 to 1975. The Wills Classic had been held in Australia from 1960 and 1962. Total prize money from 1963 to 1965 was A£4,000. In 1966 and 1967 it was A$8,000 increasing to A$10,000 in 1968, A$20,000 from 1969 to 1971, A$25,000 in 1972 and A$35,000 from 1973 to 1975. The sponsor was W.D. & H.O. Wills, a cigarette manufacturer.

Winners

In 1967 Murray won at the first hole of a sudden-death playoff. In 1968 Player won at the second extra hole.

References

Golf tournaments in Australia
Recurring sporting events established in 1963
Recurring events disestablished in 1975
1963 establishments in Australia
1975 disestablishments in Australia